A list of films produced in the Soviet Union in 1973 (see 1973 in film).

1973

External links
 Soviet films of 1973 at the Internet Movie Database

1973
Soviet
Films